1962 Soviet Class B was the 13th season of the Soviet Class B football competitions since their establishment in 1950. It was also the 22nd season of what was eventually became known as the Soviet First League.

Russian Federation

I Zone

II Zone

III Zone

IV Zone

V Zone

Final
 [Krasnodar, Oct 27 – Nov 9]

Ukraine

For places 1-6

Union republics

I Zone

Number of teams by republics

II Zone

Number of teams by republics

Final
 [Oct 31, Nov 4, Odessa] 
 Shakhtyor Karaganda  1-0 0-0 Lokomotiv Gomel

See also
 Soviet First League

External links
 1962 Soviet Championship and Cup
 1962 season at rsssf.com

1962
2
Soviet
Soviet